Meganoton nyctiphanes, the dull double-bristled hawkmoth, is a moth of the family Sphingidae.

Distribution 
It is known from Sri Lanka, India, Bangladesh, Myanmar, the Nicobar Islands, the Andaman Islands, south-eastern China, Thailand, Vietnam, Malaysia, Sumatra, Indonesia and the Philippines (Palawan).

Description 
The wingspan is 120–140 mm. It is variable in size and forewing upperside ground colour (when paler the lines appear more prominent). There is a pale band on the hindwing upperside which is slightly variable in position.

Biology 
The larvae have been recorded feeding on Symphorema involucratum in Thailand.

References

Meganoton
Moths described in 1856